

UCI Road World Rankings

World Championships

UCI World Cup

Single day races (1.1 and 1.2)

Source

Stage races (2.1 and 2.2)

Source

Continental Championships

Asian Championships

European Championships (under-23)

National Championships

UCI teams

References

See also
2009 in men's road cycling

 
 
Women's road cycling by year